Jerome Davis (born August 22, 1977) is an American former sprinter. He attended college at the University of Southern California, and was the Pacific-10 Conference champion in the men's 400m dash four consecutive years from 1996 through 1999. As a sophomore, Davis finished third at the 1997 NCAA men's Outdoor Track & Field Championships with a time of 45.36 In 1998, he won the NCAA Men's Outdoor Track & Field National Championship in the 400m event with a time of 45.18. Despite improving his time in the NCAA championships the following year, Davis finished third again, being edged out by LSU's Derrick Brew by 2 one-hundredths of a second for second place. At the 1999 World University Games, Davis took gold, with a time of 44.91. He was on the gold medal-winning USA men's 400m World Championship relay team in 1999. The victory was vacated in 2008 when a teammate confessed to using performance-enhancing drugs during that time.

References

External links
IAAF profile for Jerome Davis

1977 births
Living people
American male sprinters
Universiade medalists in athletics (track and field)
People from Ridgecrest, California
Universiade gold medalists for the United States
Medalists at the 1997 Summer Universiade